This list of French words of Germanic origin is a dictionary of standard modern French words and phrases deriving from any Germanic language of any period, whether incorporated in the formation of the French language or borrowed at any time thereafter.

Scope of the dictionary
The following list details words, affixes and phrases that contain Germanic etymons. Words where only an affix is Germanic (e.g. méfait, bouillard, carnavalesque) are excluded, as are words borrowed from a Germanic language where the origin is other than Germanic (for instance, cabaret is from Dutch, but the Dutch word is ultimately from Latin/Greek, so it is omitted). Likewise, words which have been calqued from a Germanic tongue (e.g. pardonner, bienvenue, entreprendre, toujours, compagnon, plupart, manuscrit, manoeuvre), or which received their usage or sense (i.e. were created, modified or influenced) due to Germanic speakers or Germanic linguistic habits (e.g. comté, avec, commun, on, panne, avoir, ça) are not included.

Many other Germanic words found in older versions of French, such as Old French and Anglo-French are no longer extant in Standard Modern French. Many of these words do, however, continue to survive dialectally and in English. See: List of English Latinates of Germanic origin.

Dictionary

A

aalénien (Geol.)
abandon "abandonment" (< OFr à bandon < ML *bandum < Frk *ban < Gmc *ban-, band-)
abandonner
abandonnement
abandonnataire
abandonné
abandonnée
abandonnément
abandonneur
abandonneuse
abâtardir "to abase" (< Fr à bâtard < ML bastardus, OFr bastard < Gmc *bāst-, bōst- + Gmc *-hard-)
abâtardissement
abâtardi
abigotir
abord "approach" (< Fr à bord < OFr bord, bort < Frk *bord < Gmc *borþam)
aborder
abordage
abordable
abordé
abordée
abordeur
abot
aboter (also abotter)
aboté
aboteau
abotter
abotté
abouter "(trade term) to join the ends of something" ( < à + OFr boter < Frk *bautan, bōtan (cf Frk *but "end", ON bútr) < Gmc)
about
abouté
aboutage
aboutement
aboutir "to arrive at, end in" ( < à + OFr boter < Frk *bautan, bōtan (cf Frk *but "end", ON bútr) < Gmc)
abouti
aboutissant
aboutissement
aboutonner
abraquer (Naut.) "to direct" ( < à + braquer "to direct, point" < ON brāka "to fix, set on, weaken" < Gmc)
abri "shelter" ( < OFr abrier "to cover" < LL abrigare < a- + brigare "to cover" < Frk *berihan "to cover" and Frk *berc, geberc "asylum, protection" < Gmc, cf OHG birihan "to cover", OE (be)wrēon "to cover", OHG bergan "to cover, hide")
abri-fou (also abrifou)
abri-galant
abri-sous-roche
abri-vent  (also abrivent)
abrier
abrier (also abreyer) "to protect, guarantee"
abriter
abriter "to shelter"
abrité
abritant
abritement
abroutir "to crop"
abrouti
abroutis
abuter
accon (also acon) "barge"
acconnage (also aconnage)
acconnier
accore (Naut.) "piece of wood serving as a ship's stay"
accorer
accrocher "to hook, hook up, tear with a hook" ( < à + Fr croc < ON krókr, kráka "hook" < Gmc)
accroc
accroche
accrochable
accrochage
accroche-cœur
accroche-lumière
accroche-plat
accroche-tubes
accrocheur
accrocheuse
accroupir "to cower down, squat" ( < à + Fr croupe "rump" < OFr crope < ON kroppr, kryppa < Gmc)
achôcre (Dial) "awkward; good for nothing" ( < Norm "brutal, rough" < ON skakr "a scolding" < Gmc)
achopper "to stumble" ( < à + Fr chopper < OFr choper < Gmc, cf Germ schupfen)
achoppement
acre "acre" ( < L *acrum < Gmc, cf Goth akr, OE æcer, Eng acre, Germ Acker)
adouber "to arm, strike" ( < Fr à + douber < OFr duber & dober < Gmc, cf OE dubban "to dub")
aéro-club
affaît "ridge"
affaîter
affaler "to lower a rope, drive toward the shore" ( < Dut afhalen < Gmc)
affalé
affalement
affourrager "to feed, fodder"
affourragement
affranchir "to free" ( < à + Fr franc < OFr franc < Gmc)
affranchi
affranchie
affranchissant
affranchisseur
affranchissement
enfranchisement
affres (also affre) "pangs" ( < Prov affre < Goth aifrs < Gmc)
affrètement
affréter "to freight, lade" ( < à + Fr fret "freight" < Gmc)
affréteur
affreux "frightful, horrible" ( < à + Fr affre "fright, terror" < OFr afre < Gmc, cf OHG eiver)
affre
affreuse
affreusement
agacer "to set on edge" ( < It agazzare < OHG hazjan "to harry" < Gmc)
age (Agric.) "tiller, ploughshare" ( < OFr haie < Frk *hagja "hedge, fence" < Gmc, cf Germ Hecke, OE hecg "hedge")
agasse "magpie" ( < OHG agalstra < Gmc)
agourmandi
agourmandie
agrafe "hook, clasp" ( < OFr agrape < LL *agrappa < ad + *grappa < Gmc, cf OHG krapfo)
agrafer
agrafé
agrafeur
agrafeuse
agrafure
agrapper
agrappe
agrape
agréer "to rig"
agrès "(naut) tackling, rigging" ( < gréer "to rig" < Gmc *garaiþjanan "to ready")
agriffer
agrincher (also agricher) ( < Frk *grīpjan "to seize" < Gmc)
agrinche
agrincheur
agripper "to grip, grab"
agrippant
agrippement
agrippeur
agrippeuse
agrippe-rossignols
agrouper
agroupé
agroupement
aguerrir "to accustom to war" ( < à + Fr guerre < OFr guerre < Frk *werra < Gmc *werra)
aguerri
aguerrie
aguerrissement
aguet (usu. pl. aguets) "ambush, wait" ( < OFr aguet < guetter < Frk *wahtōn < *wahta < Gmc)
aguetter
aguicher
aguichage
aguichant
aguiché
aguicherie
aguicheur
aguicheuse
aguimpé
aguimpée
aheurter "to be bent on, be stubborn" ( < à + Fr heurter < Gmc)
aheurté
aheurtement
ahonter
ahurir "to amaze" ( < à + Fr hure < Gmc)
ahuri
ahurie
ahurissant
ahurissement
aigrefin "swindler"
aigrefine
aigrette "egret" ( < OFr aigrette < OProv aigreta < aigron "heron" < OHG heigaro "heron" < Gmc)
aire "eyry" ( < Germ aren "to make a nest" < aar "eagle" < Gmc)
aigretté (also aigreté)
-ais adjective suffix ( < LL -iscus < Frk *-isk < Gmc, cf OE -isc "-ish")
-aise
alamannique
alan (also alain)
alboche
ale "ale"
alêne (also alène) "awl" ( < OFr alesne < OHG alasna, alansa  < Gmc)
alèné
alérion ( < Frk *adalaro, adalarjo "eagle, noble eagle" < Gmc)
alize (also alise) "lote-tree berry" ( < Gmc, cf OHG elira)
allemand "German" ( < Lat Allemanni < Gmc)
allemande
allemanderie
allemanisé
alleu (also aleu) "allodial property, allodial ownership" ( < OFr alou, aloud < MerovLat *allodium < Frk *allōd- < all- "all" + ōd "patrimony" < Gmc, cf OHG alôd)
franc-alleu
alleutier (also aleutier)
allo (also allô) "hello"
allodial "allodial"
allodiale
allodialité
allotir "to allot"
allotissement
alpenstock
alque ( < Norw alke < ON alka < Gmc)
alsacien
amade
amadouer "to coax, cajole" ( MFr a- + madouer "to lure, give meat to" < ON mata (Dan made) "to lure, feed" < Gmc, cf Goth matjan "to eat")
amadou
amadouage
amadoué
amadoueur
amadoueuse
amadouement
amadouvier
amarelle
amarrer "to moor"
amarre
amarré
amarrage
amarrage
amatir
amers
amet
amignarder
amignonner
amignoter (also amignotter)
amignouter (also amignoutter)
amman
ammeistre
amocher
amoché
amochée
amuser "to amuse" ( < OFr amuser "to stupefy" < a- + muser "to stare stupidly at, be bewildered", either < OFr mus "snout" < ML musum < Gmc; or < Frk *masjan, musōn "to stun, confuse, confound" < Gmc, cf OE (ā)masian "to confuse, stupefy, bewilder", ON masa "to struggle, be confused", Norw mas "exhausting labour", Norw masast "to be dazed, begin to dream", Swed masa "to dawdle, idle", Swed mos "sluggish, sleepy")
amusement
amusable
amusamment
amusant
amusante
amusard
amusé
amuse-gueule
amusée
amusette
amuseur
amuseuse
anche "pipe, reed" ( < Frk *ankja "bone canal" < Gmc, cf Goth *inka)
anché "herald"
anchée
-and (also -an, -ain ) agent suffix ( < OFr -anc, -enc < Frk *-inc < Gmc, cf Eng -ing)
-ande
Flamand
tisserand
-ange noun suffix (e.g. mésange) ( < Frk *-ing < Gmc)
anglais
anglaise
anglaisé
anglaiser
angleterre
Anglican
anglicane
anglicanisme
angliche
angliciser
anglicisé
anglicisme
Anglo-américain
Anglo-arabe
Anglo-normand
Anglo-Saxon
Anglo-saxonne
anglomane
anglomaniaque
anglomanie
anglophile
anglophilie
anglophobe
anglophobie
anglophone
angon
angstroem (also angström)
anordir
anschluss
anspect "lever" ( < Dut handtspeecke "hand-stick" < Gmc)
anté-bois (also antébois)
antéallergique
antébourgeois
anti-allemand
anti-allemande
anti-bélier
anti-bois
anti-français (also antifrançais)
anti-France
anti-guérilla
anti-guerrier
anti-joli
anti-raciste
anti-skating
anti-star (also antistar)
antichoc
antidoping
antifading
antigang
antigaulliste
antigrippe
antirides
antitrust
antitrusts
apiquer
apiquage
aplat
aplatir
aplatir
aplati
aplatissage
aplatissant
aplatissement
aplatisseur
aplatissoir
aplatissoire
après-guerre
après-ski
après-souper
arauder
arc-bouter
arc-boutant
arc-bouté
arc-boutement
-ard noun suffix ( < OFr -ard < LL -ardus < Frk *-hard < Gmc, cf OHG -hart, Goth -hardus)
-arde
ardillon "tongue of a buckle" ( < MFr hardillon < Frk *hard "hard" < Gmc + -ille + -on)
arlequin "harlequin"
arlequine
arlequiner
arlequiner
arlequiné
arlequinade
armet "helmet, headpiece" ( < It elmetto "helmet" < Fr helme, heaume "helmet" < Frk *helm < Gmc *helmaz, cf OE helm "helm, helmet")
armon
arnac (also arnaque)
arnache
arnaquer
arnaquer ( < Pic harnacher, arnaquer "to amuse, swindle" < harnacher "to harness, equip, disguise" < Gmc)
arnaqueur
arnaqueuse
arnauldiste (also arnaldiste)
arquebuse "arquebus"
arquebuser
arquebuser
arquebusade
arquebuserie
arquebusier
arquemontant ( alt. of earlier arqubouter < Gmc)
arquemontante
arranger "to arrange"
arrangement
arrangé
arrangeable
arrangeant
arrangeur
arrière-ban "arriere-ban"
arrière-fief
arrière-garde
arrière-salle
arrimer
arrimage
arrimeur
arrimeuse
arroi "array"
assener "to strike" ( < a- + OFr sen "direction" < Gmc, cf OHG sinnan, Goth sinþan)
assené
assénement
aste
astic "polishing paste"
asticot "small worm"
astibloque
astibloche
asticoter "to tease, plague"
asticotage
asticoteur
astiquer "to polish leather (with an astic)"
astiquage
astique
astiqué
astiqueur
âtre "fireplace"
attacher "to attach"
attachement
attachant
attache
attaché
attachée
attacheur
attacheuse
rattacher
soustacher
détachement
attaquer "to attack"
attaquabilité
attaquable
attaquant
attaquante
attaque
attaqué
attaqueur
attifer "to adorn the head" ( < Frk *tipp-, tipf- < Gmc *tupp- "point", cf OHG tipfōn "to decorate", ON *tippa, MDu tip "point")
attifage
attifé
attifement
attifet
attifeur
attifeuse
attifiaux
attignole
attirer "to attract"
attirail
attirable
attirance
attirant
attirement
attoucher "to touch, contact"
attouchement "touch, contact"
attraper "to trap, catch"
attrape
attrapé
attrapable
attrapade
attrapage
attrapeur
attrapeuse
attrapoire
attrape-gogo (also attrape-gogos)
attrape-mouche (also attrape-mouches)
attrape-nigaud
attrouper "to assemble, gather"
attroupé
attroupement
aubère
auberge "inn"
auberger
aubergerie
aubergiste
aubert
aubète (also aubette)
auburn
-aud (also -aut) agent suffix ( < OFr -aud < LL -aldus < Frk *-wald < Gmc)
-aude
aulne (also aune)
aulnage (also aunage)
aulnette
aune "an ell" (< Ofr alne < LL alena < Goth aleina < Gmc, cf OE eln "ell)
auner
auner
aunée
auneur
aunnage
aurochs
auto-stop
autoguidage
autoguidé
auvent "penthouse", ″awning″ ( < ML auventus < Prov emban < ambitus + bann < Gmc)
avachir "to become limp"
avachi
avachissant
avachissement
avant-garde
avant-gardisme
avant-gardiste
avant-guerre
avion-stop

B
baba
babiller "to babble, chatter" ( < Gmc, cf ME babelen (Eng babble), ON babbla, Dut babbelen, Germ babbeln)
babil
babillard
babillarde
babillage
babillement
babillant
babillerie
babillet
babilleur
babilleuse
babine "lip, mouth, chops" ( < bab "lip, grimace" < Gmc, cf Germ dial Bäppe)
bâbord "portside, larboard"
bâbordais
babouin "baboon, monkey" ( < bab "lip, grimace" < Gmc, cf Germ dial Bäppe)
babouine
babouiner
baby
baby-foot
bac "ferry-boat"
bacante (also bacantes) "beard, moustache" ( < Germ Backe "cheek" < Gmc)
bâche "awning, frame" ( < Wallon batche "board, plank < Gmc, cf MFr bauche < Frk *balko "balk, balcony" < Gmc)
bachot "wherry, small skiff"
bachoter
bachoteur
bachoteuse
bachotage
backfisch (also backfish)
bâcler "to close (a door or window) with a cross-beam" ( < MDu bakkelen "to cause to stay" < MDu bakken, backen "to cause to stick, make immovable, prop" < Gmc)
bâclage
bâclé
bâcleur
bâcleuse
débâcler
débâcle
bacon
baconien
baconienne
baconianisme
bada
badaboum
badge
badigeon "stone-colored" ( < Germ Batzen "paste, a kneaded mass" < Gmc)
badigeonner
badigeonnage
badigeonneur
badigoinces
badingouin
badingouine
badingredin
badingredine
badingueusard
badingueusarde
badingueux
badingueuse
badminton
baedeker
baffouer "to baffle"
baffouage
baffouement
baffoueur
bâfrer
bâfrerie
bâfreur
bagage "baggage"
bagagiste
bagarre "fray, tumult" ( < MFr bagarot "noise, tumult, contention, strife" < Gmc, cf OHG bâga "dispute", OHG bâgan "to argue", ON bagga "to hinder, prevent")
bagarrer
bagarreur
bagoter (also bagotter)
bagotte
bague "ring"
bagues
baguer
baguer "to ring"
bagué
baguage
bagueur
baguier
bahut "chest, trunk" ( < Frk *baghūdi, baghōdi "protection, sideboard" < bage "bag, pack" < Gmc + hūdi, hōdi "protection" < Gmc, cf MHG behut "hutch, cupboard")
bahuter
bahuter
bahuté
bahutier
balafre "a gash, a long notch" ( < OFr balefre < Frk *bal-leffur < Gmc, cf OHG leffur "lip")
balafrer
balafrer
balafré
balandre (also bélandre)
balbuzard
balcon "balcony"
balcon-terrasse
balconnage
balconnet
balèvre
ball-trap
ballast
ballaster
ballaster
ballastage
ballastière
balle "ball"
baller
ballon
ballot
balle (also bale, bâle) "package" ( < Frk *balla < Gmc, cf OHG balo, MHG balle, Germ Ballen "bundle")
déballer
emballer
ballon "balloon"
ballon-prisonnier
ballon-sonde
ballonner
ballonnet
ballonner
ballonné
ballonnement
ballonnant
ballonnier
ballot "package"
ballotter
balluche
ballotte
ballottine
ballotter
ballottage
ballottade
ballotté
ballottement
ballotteur
ballotteuse
balluche (also baluche)
balluchon
balluchard
ballucharde
ban "ban"
forban
bandon
banal
banale
banal "banal"
banalité
banaliser
banale
banalement
banaliser
banalisation
banc "bench"
banable
bancaire
bancal
bancale
bancasse
bancelle
banquet
banquette
bancal "bandy-legged"
banche
bancher
bancher
banché
banco
bancocrate
bancocratie
bancroche
bancruche
bande "band"
bandeau
bandellette
bander
bande-son
bandereau
bande "troop"
banderille
banderiller
banderillero
bander "to bandage"
bandage
bandagiste
bandé
bandaison
banderole "streamer, banderole"
banderoler
banderolé
bandière "banner"
bandit "bandit"
banditisme
bandolier "bandolier"
bandoline
bandonéon
bandoulier
bandoulière "bandoleer"
bandure
bang
bank-note
banlieue "suburbs"
banlieusard
banlieusarde
banlon
bannière "banner"
banneret
bannir "to bannish"
banni
bannissable
bannissement
banque "bank"
banquer
banquier
banquereau
banqueroute "bankruptcy"
banqueroutier
banqueroutière
banquet "banquet"
banqueter
banquet-souvenir
banquetage
banqueteur
banquette
banquezingue
banquier
banquière
banquise
banquisme
banquiste
banvin
baquet "tub"
baqueter
baqueter
baquetage
bar (Zoo.) "sea bass"( < Dut barse, baerse "pole, bar" < Gmc)
barbet "barbet spaniel"
bard "litter, hand-barrow"
barder
bardeur
débarder
débardeur
barge (Zoo.) ( < Prov barja "chatter" < Gmc *brekan)
barguigner "to haggle" ( < OFr bargaigner < Frk *borganjan < Gmc *borgan, cf OE borgian "to borrow")
barguignade
barguignage
barguigneur
barguigneuse
barigel ( < Ital barigello < LL barigildus < Lomb barigild < Gmc)
baril "barrel" ( < OFr baril < Frk *baril, beril "barrel, jug, container" or Burg *berils "container, bearer", both < Gmc *berila-z "container, jug" < *beranan "to carry, transport" + *-ilaz agent/instrumental suffix, cf ON berill "barrel for liquids", OHG biril "large pot", OS biril "basket", Frk *bera "stretcher", OE beran "to carry")
barillage
barillet
barmaid
barman
baron "baron"
baronne
baronner
baronnet
baronnie
baronifier
baronial
baronnial
baroniser
baronner
baronnage
baronnerie
barouf ( < Ital baruffa < baruffare < Lomb *bihrōffjan < Gmc, cf OHG bihruofjan)
baroufe
bas-bleu
bas-bleuisme
bas-flanc
bas-hauban
bas-mât
base-ball
basedowien
basedowienne
basketball
basketteur
basketteuse
basque "skirt" ( < Prov basto < Frk*bastjan < Gmc)
bastardon
bastide "house in the country, villa"
bastidon
bastille "fortress, Bastille"
bastillé
bastillonné
basting
bastingage (also bastingages) "netting"
bastingue
bastinguer
bastion "bastion"
bastionner
bastionner
bastionné
bastringuer ( < Dut bas drinken < Gmc)
bastringue
bat-flanc
bâtard "bastard"
bâtarde
bâtardise
bâtardeau
bâtarder
batardeau "dyke"
bateau "boat"
bateau-citerne
bateau-feu
bateau-lavoir
bateau-mouche
bateau-phare
bateau-pilote
bateau-pompe
bateau-porte
bateau-stop
batelet
bateler
bateler
batelage
batelier
batelière
batellerie
batelée
bath
bâtir "to build"
bâti
bâtiment
bâtisse
bâtissable
bâtissage
bâtisseur
bâtisseuse
bastille
bâtir "to baste"
batz
bau
baud ( < Frk *bald < Gmc, cf OHG bald, OE beald)
baudet "donkey"
baudir ( < Frk *baldjan < Gmc, cf OE bieldan)
baudrier "baldric"
baudroie
baudroyeur
baudrucher "to prepare leather"
baudruche
bauge "lair"
bauger
baugé
baugue (also bauque)
bazooka ( < Eng bazooka < bazoo "boastful talk" < Dut bazuin "trumpet")
be-bop
beatnik
beaupré "bowsprit"
bébé "baby" ( < Eng baby < ME babe, baban)
bedeau "beadle"
beethovenien
beethovenienne
beffroi "belfry"
bégard
béguin "fancy"
béguine
béguinette
béguiner
bégard
béguinos
béguiner
béguinage
béguinerie
behaviorisme (also behaviourisme)
behavioriste (also behaviouriste)
beigne
beignet "beignet, fritter"
bélandre "bilander"
bélier "ram, bellwether"
bélière
bélière "clapper-ring"
bélître "scoundrel"
bénard
bénarde
bénoche
berce
berdiner
berdin
bergame ( < Bergamo < L bergomum < Lig berg "mountain" < Gmc *bergaz "mountain"; also attributed to berg + haim "home")
bergamasque
bergamine
berlaud
berline "berlin"
berlingot
berlingue
berlinois
berlinoise
berme "berm"
bernard l'ermite (also bernard l'hermite)
bernard lermite (also bernard lhermite)
bernardin
bernardine
berne "to swaddle" ( OFr berne "cloth" < MDu berme "edge, hem" < Gmc)
berner
bernesque (also berniesque)
bertha
berthe
berthelée
berthelet
besogne "business, work"
besogner
besogneux
besogner
besognement
besoin "need"
besoigneux
best-seller
biaude
biche "small dog" ( < Gmc, cf OE bicce "bitch", ON bikkia, Germ Betze, Peize)
bichon
bichonne
bichonner
bichonnage
bichet
bicot
bide
bidon "can, jug" ( < Norm bide < ON *bida "container" < Gmc)
bidonier
bidonier
bidonne
bidonner
bidonnier
bidonville
bide
bidule
bief "mill-race"
bière "beer"
bière "bier" ( < Frk *bera < Gmc, cf OHG bara "litter")
bièvre "beaver"
biez "mill-race"
bifteck "steak"
bifteckifère
bighorn
bigle "beagle"
bigot "bigot" ( < MFr < OFr bigot "derogatory word applied to Normans" < OE bi Gode "by God" < Gmc)
bigote
bigotement
bigoterie
bigotisme
abigoter
bigre
bigrement
bilboquet "a cup and ball"
billiard "billiards"
billarder
bille "small ball" ( < OFr bille "small ball" < Frk *bikkil < Gmc, cf OHG bickel "die, ossicle", Dut bikkel "ossicle")
billiard
biller
billebaude
billette
bique "she-goat"
biquet
biquette
bire
bis "brown" ( < Frk *bīsi < Gmc)
bisant
biscôme
biscoter
bise "bise, north wind"
biser
bisant
bismuth "bismuth"
bison "bison"
bissel
bistre "bistre"
bit
bitte ( < ON biti < Gmc)
bitter
bitture (also biture)
bitton
débit
débiter
bivouac "bivouac"
bivaquer
bivouaquer
blackball (also blacboule, blackboule)
blackbouler
black-bass
black-bottom
black-out
black-rot
blackbouler
blackboulé
blackboulage
blafard "pallid, wan"
blafardement
blague
blaguer
blaguer
blagueur
blagueuse
blaireau "badger"
blanc "white, blank" ( < OFr blanc < Frk *blank < Gmc *blanka- blinding, white, cf OHG blanch, OE blanca)
blanc-bec
blanc-de-baleine
blanc-éstoc (also blanc-étoc)
blanc-manger
blanc-nez
blanc-seeing
blanchaille
blanche
blanchecaille
blanchette
blanchiment
blanchoyer
blanco
blancs-manteaux
blanque
blanquet (also blaquet)
blanquisme
blanquiste
blanchet
blancher
blanchâtre
blanchir
blanquette
blanchir
blanchi
blanchissage
blanchissant
blanchissement
blanchisserie
blanchisseur
blanchisseuse
blancher
blancheur
blanchement
blancherie
blaquet
blaser "to satiate, cloy, blunt"
blase
blasé
blasement
blason
blason "coat of arms"
blasonner
blasonner
blasonné
blatérer "to bleat" ( < partly from Lat blaterare "to chatter" and partly from Frk *blātan "to bleat, cry like a sheep" < Gmc, cf OHG blāzan "to bleat", Dut blaten, OE blǣtan)
blatèrement
blatier "cornfactor" ( < LL *bladarius < Gmc *blada-)
blatte
blaude
blave
blavin
blaze
blé "wheat, grain"
blaireau
blatier
bléer
blèche "soft"
bléer
bleime
blême "pale" ( < OFr blesme < blesmir "to turn pale" < Frk blesmjan "to make pale" < Gmc)
blémir
blémir
blêmeur
blêmissant
blêmissement
blende
blesser "to wound" ( < OFr < Frk *blettjan < Gmc, cf OHG bleizza "bruise")
blessé
blessée
blessant
blessable
blessure
blessement
blet "over-ripe" ( < Gmc *blada-)
blette
blettir (also blétir)
blettir (also blétir)
blettissement
bleu "blue" ( < OFr bleu, blo(u), blao < Frk *blao < Gmc *blǣwaz, cf OHG blāo, OE blāw)
bleuir
bleuâtre
bleuâtrement
bleue
bleuet
bleuette
bleuir
bleusaille
bleuter
bleuir
bleueur
bleui
bleuie
bleuissement
bleuissure
bleuité
bleuter
bleuté
bleutée
bleuterie
bliaud (also bliaut)
blinde (also blindes) "sheeting" ( < Germ Blende < Gmc)
blinder
blinder
blindé
blindage
blinquer
blitz
blizzard
bloc "block" ( < OFr bloc < MDu bloc "tree-trunk" or OHG bloc, bloh < Gmc *bluk-)
bloquer
bloc-notes (also block-notes)
blocage
blocaille
blocard
blocarde
blochet
débloquer
blockhaus "blockhouse" ( < Germ Blockhaus < Gmc)
blocus "blockade; investment" ( < Germ dial blockhuis < Gmc)
blond "blond" ( < OFr blond, blont < ML blundus < Frk *blund < Gmc *bland-, cf OE blondenfeax "grey-haired")
blonde
blondin
blondir
blonder
blondasse
blondement
blondiche
blondoyer
blondasse
blondasserie
blonder
blonderie
blondeur
blondin
blondine
blondinet
blondinette
blondir
blondi
blondinet
blondoyer
blondoiement
bloom
blooming
bloquer
bloque
bloqué
bloquette
bloqueur
blot
blottir "to crouch, squat" ( < Germ blotten < Gmc, cf OHG blotzen "to crush", Dut blutsen "to contuse, injure")
blotti
blottissement (also blotissement)
blouse "bump" ( < Dut bluts < Gmc)
blouser
blouse "blouse" ( < *vêtement de laine blouse < Prov (lano) blouso "pure (wool)" < OHG blōz "empty, naked, pure" < Gmc *blauta-, cf OE blēat "poor")
blouse-tunique
blouser
blouson
blousier
blouser
blousé
blue-jean
blues
bluet
bluette
bluetter
bluff
bluffer
bluffer
bluffeur
bluffeuse
bluter "to bolt" ( < MHG biuteln "to bolt" < biūtel < Gmc, cf MDu buydelen, budelen, Dut builen)
blutage
bluteau
bluterie
bluteur
blutoir
bob
bobard
bobardier
bobèche "socket"
bobècherie
bobéchon
bobelet (also bobsleigh, bob)
bobine "bobbin"
bobiner
bobinard
bobineau
bobinet
bobinette
bobinier
bobinière
bobinoir
bobinot
bobiner
bobiné
bobineur
bobineuse
bobinage
bobosse
bocage "thicket, grove" ( < OFr boscage < L boscaticum < L boscum, buscum "bush, wood" < Gmc *buskaz)
bocager
bocagère
bocageux
bocambre
bocard
bocarder
bocardage
bocage (also boccage)
boche
bochiman (also boschiman)
bochimane (also boschimane)
bock
bockeur
boggie (also bogie)
boghei (also boguet, buggy)
bogue "chain, ring of iron" ( < N. Ital boga < Lomb bauga "ring" < Gmc, cf OE bēag "ring")
boier
bois "wood" ( < OFr < L *boscum, buscum < Gmc *buskaz)
hautbois
boiser
deboiser
reboiser
bouquet
boisure
boiser
boisé
boisage
boiserie
boisement
boiseur
boiseux
bol "bowl" ( < Eng bowl < OE bolla < Gmc *bul-)
bolaire
bombance "feast"
bombancer
bombancier
bon-henri
bonbanc
bonde "floodgate, sluice" ( < Swab bunte < Gmc, cf MHG bunde)
bondon
bonder
bondard
débonder
bonder
bondé
bondon
bondonner
bonnet "bonnet" ( < OFr bonet "material for hats" < Frk *bunni < Gmc *bund-)
bonneter
bonnetier
bonnetière
bonneteau
bonneton
bonnette
bonneter
bonnetade
bonneteur
bonneterie
boogie-woogie
book
bookmaker
boom
booléien (also booléen)
booléienne (also booléenne)
bootlegger
boqueteau
boquillon
boquillonne
boquillonner
bord "edge, border"
border
bordure
aborder
déborder
rebord
bordereau
bordailler
bordayer
borde
bordeaux
bordel
bordière
bordigue
bordel
bordelais
bordelaise
bordelier
bordelière
border
bordé
bordée
bordage
borderie
borgne "one-eyed" ( < L *bornius < *borna "hole, cavity" < Gmc, cf OHG borōn "to bore")
borgnat (also borgniat)
borgnesse
borgnio
borgnion
borgniot
borgnon
bort
bos (also boss) "boss"
bochiman (also boschiman) "bushman"
bochimane (also boschimane)
bosel
bosquet "thicket"
bosse "hump" ( < Frk *bottja < Frk *bōtan "to strike, beat" < Gmc)
bosser
bossu
bossue
bossuer
bosseler
bossette
bosseyeur
bosseyeuse
bossoir
bosse "hawser"
bosser
bossoir
bosseler
bosselage
bosselard (also bosselar)
bosselé
bossellement
bosselure
bosser
bossage
bossant
bossard
bosseur
bosseuse
bossuer
bossuage
bossué
bosseman "boatswain's mate"
boston
bostonner
bot "club-foot" (also bote)
botte "truss, bundle" ( < Gmc, cf OHG bōzo "bundle, fagot")
botteler
bottelette
bottillon
botte "butt, leather bottle, boot" ( < Gmc, cf Germ Bütte)
botter
bottier
bottine
bottillon
botte "lunge, thrust" ( < Ital botta < bottare < Fr bouter < Gmc)
botte "tuft" ( < Dut bote < Gmc)
botteler
bottelage
bottelé
bottelée
botteleur
botteleuse
bottelier
botteloir
botter
botté
bottée
botteur
bottine "half-boot"
bottinette
bouc "buck, male goat" ( < OFr bouc "male goat" < Frk *bukk < Gmc *bukkon, cf OE bucca "male goat", OE buc "male deer", OHG boc "male goat", ON bokkr "buck")
boucage
boucaille
boucan
boucaut
bouquetin
bouquin
boucher
boucan
boucane
boucaner
boucanier
boucaner
boucanage
boucané
boucharde
boucharder
boucharder
bouchardage
bouchardeuse
boucher "butcher"
boucherie
boucher "to stop up, block" ( < bousche "faggot, straw handle" < LL *bosca "undergrowth, beam of branches" < bosci "wood" < Gmc)
bouchage
bouché
bouche-trou
bouchée
bouchement
bouchère
boucheton
boucheton à
boucheur
bouchoir
bouchon
bouchure
déboucher
débouché
bouchon "whisp of straw" ( < bousche "faggot, straw handle" < LL *bosca "undergrowth, beam of branches" < bosci "wood" < Gmc)
bouchonner
bouchonnier
bouchonner
bouchonnage
bouchonné
bouchonnement
bouchonneux
bouder ( < Wall boder "to swell" < Gmc, cf MLG buddich "swollen", ME budde "bud", ON budda "purse", OS budil "bag, purse", Goth bauþs "section")
boudeur
boudeuse
bouderie
boudeusement
boudin
boudoir
boudin
boudiner
boudinier
boudinière
boudiner
boudinage
boudine
boudiné
boudinée
boudinement
boudineuse
bouffer "to puff" ( < OFr buffier < Gmc, cf MDu puffen, LG pof, puf "a puff", OE pyffan "to puff")
bouffant
bouffante
bouffard
bouffarde
bouffe
bouffée
bouffette
bouffeur
bouffeuse
bouffir
bouffard
bouffarde
bouffarder
bouffir
bouffi
bouffie
bouffissure
bouffon
bouffonne
bouffonner
bouffonesque (also bouffonnesque)
bouffoniste (also bouffonniste)
bouffonnade
bouffonner
bouffonnant
bouffonnement
bouffonnerie
bouée "buoy" ( < MFr boie, boue(e) < Frk *baukan "beacon" < Gmc *baukn, cf OHG bouhhan, OFris bāken "beacon")
bougon "grumbling"
bougonner
bougonner
bougonnade
bougonnage
bougonnement
bougonnerie
bougonneur
bougonneuse
boujon "arrow" ( < OFr bulzun "arrow" < Frk *bultjo "bolt" < Gmc, cf MHG bolz, Dut bolt)
boujonner
boulanger "baker" ( < OFr boulenc "baker" < Frk *bolla "bread" + -enc "-ing" < Gmc, cf OHG bolla' "wheat flour", MDu bolle "round loaf")
boulangerie
boulangère
boulangerie-pâtisserie
boulangisme
boulangiste
bouledogue "bulldog"
boulevard "boulevard" ( < OFr bollevart, boulevert, bouleverc "rampart converted to an avenue" < Walloon < MDu bolwerk, bollewerc "bulwark" < bolle, bol "bole, trunk, torso" < Gmc + werk "work" < Gmc)
boulevarder
boulevardier
boulevardière
boulevari (also boulvari) ( alt. < hourvari)
boulin "putlog-hole" ( < Frk *bole "bowl" < Frk *bolla "bowl" < Gmc, cf OE bolla "bowl")
bouline "bowline" ( < Eng bowline < Gmc)
bouliner
boulinette
boulinier
boulinière
bouliner
boulinage
boulingrin "bowling green" ( < Eng < Gmc)
boumer "to boom" ( < Gmc, cf Dut bommen "to boom", Germ bummen", ME bummen "to buzz")
boum
bouquet "bouquet" ( < OFr bousquet, bosquet < L *boscum, buscum < Gmc *buskaz "bush")
bouqueter
bouquetier
bouquetière
bouqueter
bouqueté
bouquetin
bouquin "he-goat" ( < bouc < Gmc)
bouquin "old book" ( < Dut boeckin "little book" < Dut boek "book" < Gmc + -kin < Gmc)
bouquiner
bouquiniste
bouquinerie
bouquiner
bouquineur
bourg "borough, town" ( < OFr burg, bourg, borg, borc < L burgus < Frk *burg < Gmc *burgs "fortress", cf OE burg "burgh, borough")
bourg-épine
bourgeois
bourgade
bourgadier
bourgeois "citizen, burgher"
bourgeoise
bourgeoisie
bourgeoisement
bourgeoisant
bourgeoisisme
bourgeon "shoot, bud" ( < OFr burjon "sprout" < Gmc, cf OHG burjan "to lift, raise")
bourgeonner
ébourgeonner
bourgeonneux
bourgeonner
bourgeonnant
bourgeonnement
bourgmestre "burgomaster, mayor"
bourgogne
bourguignon
bourguignonne
bourguignot (also bourguignote, bourguignotte)
bourlinguer
bourlingue
bourlingueur
bourlingueuse
bourrir ( < Frk *būrjan < Gmc)
bouscatier
bousculer "to turn upside down"
bousculade
bousculant
bousculé
bousculement
bousculeur
bousculeuse
bousin (also bouzin) ( < Eng bousing "strong drink" < MDu būsen "to drink" < Gmc)
bousineur
bousinier
bousingot
bousingot
bousingotisme
boustifailler
boustifaille
boustifailleur
bout "end"
bout-dehors (also boute-dehors)
bout-rimé (also boute-rimé)
bout-en-train "breeder-horse"
bouter
debout
embouter
aboutir
boutasse
bouter "to put, push"
bouté
boutée
boutade "freak"
boute
boute-hors
boute-selle
boute-feu (also boutefeu) "linstock"
bouture
bouton
boute-selle
arc-boutant
bouterolle
bouteroue
boutis
boutisse
bouture "cut, slip"
boutoir
bouterolle
bouteroller
bouton "button"
bouton d'or
boutonner
déboutonner
boutonnerie
boutonnier
boutonnière
boutonner
boutonnant
boutonné
boutonneux
boutre
bouture
bouturer
bouturer
bouturage
bow-window
bowling
box-calf
boxer "to box" ( < Eng box < ME boxen "to box, beat", box "a blow" < Gmc, cf MDu boke "a blow", MHG buc "a blow", Dan bask "a blow")
boxe
boxeur
boy
boy-scout
boycott
boycotter
boycotter
boycottage
braconner "to poach"
braconnier
braco
braconnage
braconné
braconnière
bracot
brader
braderie
bradeur
bradeuse
bragard (also braguard)
bragarde
brague
braguet
braguette
brai "tar residue" ( < Frk *bred "board" < Gmc)
brailler "to brawl"
braillard
brain-trust
braire "to bray"
braiement
brailler
brailler
braille
braillant
braillante
braillard
braillarde
braillement
brailleur
brailleuse
braiment
braise "gleed, glowing embers"
braiser
braisière
braisiller
braiser
braisé
braisiller
braisillant
braisillement
bramer "to bell" ( < Ital bramare < Prov bramar "to sing, shout", Goth bra(m)mon < Gmc *brammōn, cf MHG brummen "to thunder, roar", MLG brammen)
bramant
bramante
bramée
bramement
brand (also brant)
brandade
brandir
brande "heather"
brandin
brandine
brandebourg "the frogs of a coat"
brandevin "brandy"
brandevinier
brandevinière
brandir "to brandish"
brandi
brandissage
brandissement
brandiller
brandiller
brandillant
brandillement
brandilloire
brandon "piece of straw"
brandonner
brandy
branler "to shake" ( < brandiller "shake a sword at" < OFr brandeler "wave a sword" < LL brandulare < Gmc, cf ON brandr "sword, brand")
branle
branlage
branlant
branlante
branle-bas (also branlebas)
branlée
branlette
branleur
branleuse
branloter (also branlotter)
branloire
branlement
ébranler
braque "brachhound; fool"
braquer
braquet
bracon
braconnier
braquemart (also braquemard) "broadsword"
braquer (Naut.) "to direct, point" ( < ON brāka "to fix, set on, weaken" < Gmc)
braquage
braqueur
braquement
braser
brasage
brasero
brasier "brazier"
brasière
brasiller
brasure
brasiller
brasillant
brasillement
brasque
brasquer
brayaud
brayer ( < ON, OE brǣda "to tar" < Gmc, cf OS brādan, OHG brātan "to roast")
débrayer
embrayer
brayon
break
break-water (also breack-water)
breakfast
brèche "breach, gap"
brèche-dent
bréchiforme
ébrécher
bréchet "brisket"
brédissure
bredouiller
bredouillage
bredouillant
bredouillard
bredouille
bredouillé
bredouillement
bredouilleur
bredouilleuse
bredouillis
bredouillon
bréger
brehaigne "barren" (also bréhaigne)
brelan "brelan (a game of cards)"
brelander
brelandier
brelandière
brème "bream"
brême
brequin
brésil
brésiléine
brésilien
brésilienne
brésiline
brésillet
brésiller "to cut into small pieces (of wood)"
brésis (also brisis)
brétailler
brétailleur
bretèche
breteché (also bretesché)
bretechée (also breteschée)
bretelle "strap" ( < OFr < Frk *bredel, bredil "bridle, strap" < Gmc *bregþil-, cf OHG brittel, brittil "bridle", OHG brettan "to weave, braid", OE brīdel "bridle", OE bregdan "to braid, weave")
brette "long sword" ( < ON bregþa < Gmc)
bretailler
brettelure
bretter
bretture
bretter
bretteur
bretzel
bricage
bricheton
bricole "breast band" ( < Ital briccola < Lomb brihhil < Gmc, cf MHG brëchel-, Germ brechen "to break")
bricoler
bricolier
bricoler
bricolage
bricoleur
bricoleuse
bride "bridle"
brider
bridon
débrider
brider
bridé
bridoir
bridure
bridge
bridger
bridger
bridgeur
bridgeuse
brie
brié
briée
brightique
brimbaler (also bringuebaler, briquebaler)
brimbalant
brimbale
brimbalement
brimbaleur
brimbelle
brimer
brimé
brimade
brinde "a toast"
brinder
brindezingue
bringue "festival, vice"
bringuer "to toast"
bringue "silly girl; manhunter" ( < Frk *springan "to jump" < Gmc)
brioche "cake"
brioché
brique "brick"
briquer
briqueter
briquage
briquet
briquette
briquer
briqué
briqueter
briqueté
briquetage
briqueterie
briquetier
brise "breeze"
brise "a break, breaking"
brise-bise
brise-cou
brise-glace
brise-glaces
brise-jet
brise-lames
brise-raison
brise-tout
briser "to break" ( < OFr bruisier, brisier < Frk *brusjan "to break" < Gmc *brusjanan "to crush, break", cf OHG bristan "to break", OE brȳsan "to crush, bruise")
bris
brise
brisé
brisée
brisable
brisant
briseur
briseuse
brisement
brisure
brisis
brisoir
bristol
brocanter "to deal in used goods"
brocante
brocantage
brocanteur
brocanteuse
brocard "a taunt"
brocarder
brocarder
brocardé
brocardeur
brocardeuse
brodequin "sock, buskin" ( < Flem brosekin < Gmc)
broder "embroider" ( < OFr brosder, broisder < Frk *brozdōn Gmc *bruzdajanan)
brodé
broderie
brodeur
brodeuse
broie
broiement
broigne
brosse "brush"
brosser
brosserie
brossier
brossière
brossure
brosser
brossée
brosseur
brossage
brou
brouée
brouet "broth"
brouette "wheelbarrow" ( < Wal berouette < Wal beroue < Gmc *berwaz, cf OE bearwe "wheelbarrow", MHG bere)
brouetter
brouettier
brouetter
brouettage
brouettée
brouetteur
brouetteuse
brougham
brouillard "fog" ( < brouiller < Gmc)
brouiller "to embroil, mingle" ( < OFr broiller < L *brodiculare < L *brodum < Gmc *bruþan, cf OE broþ "broth", OE brēowan "to brew")
brouillé
brouilleur
brouilleuse
brouillement
brouillage
brouille
brouillerie
brouillon
débrouiller
embrouiller
brouillard
brouillardeux
brouillasser
brouilleux
brouillis
brouillasser
brouillasse
brouillassé
brouillon
brouillonne
brouillonner
brouir "to blight" ( < OFr broīr < Frk *brājan < Gmc)
broui
brouissure
broussaille (also broussailles) "brushwood"
broussailleux
brousse "undergrowth"
brousse ( < Prov broce "curdled milk" < Goth gabrūka "piece" < brūkja "what is broken" < Gmc)
brousser
broussard
broussin
broussin
brout "sprouts, young shoots"
brouter
broutille
brouter
broutage
broutant
broutement
brouteur
brouteuse
broutille
broutiller
brownien
browning
broyer "to crush, grind" ( < Lat *bricare < Frk *brikan "to break" < Gmc *brekanan)
broyage
broyat
broie
broiement
broyeur
broyeur-mélangeur
broyeuse
broyon
bru "daughter-in-law"
bruccio
brugeois
brugeoise
bruges
brugnon
brûle-pourpoint
brûler "to burn" ( < OFr brusler "to burn" < conflation of OFr bruir "to burn" < Frk *brōjan "to burn, scald" < Gmc, cf MHG brüejen "to burn, scald" + OFr usler < Lat ustulare "to scorch")
brûlé
brûlée
brûlable
brûlage
brûlant
brûleur
brûleuse
brûlement
brûlerie
brûlis
brûloir
brûlure
brûlot
brûle-bout
brûle-gueule
brûle-parfum
brûle-parfums
brûle-pourpoint
brûle-pourpoint à
brûle-tout
brûlot
brûlotier
brun "brown"
brune
brunet
brunette
brunelle
brunir
brunâtre
embrunir
rembrunir
brunir
bruni
brunie
brunante
brunante à la
brunissage
brunissant
brunissement
brunisseur
brunisseuse
brunissoir
brunissure
brusque "brisk" ( < Ital brusco < OHG bruttisc "dark, annoyed" < Gmc)
brusquer
brusquerie
brusquement
brusquet
buander
buanderie
buandier
buandière
bucail
bucaille
bûche "log" ( < OFr busche < Prov busca < Lat busca, bosca < Gmc *buska-)
bûcher
bûcheron
bûchement
bûchette
bûcher
bûché
bûcheur
bûcheuse
bûchage
bûcheron
bûcheronne
bûcheronner
bûcheronner
bûcheronnage
buée "lye" ( < buer "to wash" < Frk *būkōn "to wash" < Gmc, cf MLG būken "to soak in lye", MHG būchen, ME bouken "to buck, wash in lye")
buer
buée
bue
buander
bugne
building
buis "bush"
buiser
buissière
buisson
buisson
buissonner
buissonnier
buissonnière
buissonnement
buissonneux
école buissonnière
buissonner
buissonnant
buissonnage
bull-dog
bull-finch
bull-terrier
bulldozer
bunker
buquer
burette "cruet"
burg
burgonde
burgrave "burgrave"
burgraviat
burin "a graver" ( < Ital borino < Lomb *boro, borin- < Gmc, cf Germ bohren)
buriner
buriniste
burinos
buriner
buriné
burineur
burinage
busard
busc "busk"
busquer
busquière
buse "pipe, cavity" ( < OFr buise < Gmc, cf Dut buis)
buser
busette
business
businessman
busquer "to search for, look for"
busqué
busquière
busserole
but "mark, aim"
buter
bute
buter "to strike, aim"
butant
buté
butée
buteur
butière
débuter
début
rebuter
rebut
butoir
butin "booty"
butiner
butiner
butinage
butinant
butiné
butinement
butineur
butineuse
butte "butte"
butte-témoin
butter
buttoir
butter
buttage
butté
butteur
butteuse

See also
 History of French
 Old Frankish
 Franks
 List of Spanish words of Germanic origin
 List of Portuguese words of Germanic origin
 List of Galician words of Germanic origin
 List of French words of Gaulish origin

Notes

References
Auguste Brachet, An Etymological Dictionary of the French Language: Third Edition
Auguste Scheler, "Dictionnaire d'étymologie française d'après les résultats de la science moderne" 
Centre National de Ressources Textuelles et Lexicales 
Dictionary.com
Friedrich Diez, "An Etymological Dictionary of the Romance Languages"
Dossier des Latinistes, La Greffe Germanique 

French Germanic
Germanic A